Inconfundible may refer to:

Inconfundible (Víctor Manuelle album), 1999 album
Inconfundible (La Mafia album), 2001 album